Kishan Rungta (3 September 1932 – 1 May 2021) was an Indian cricketer and administrator.

Life
Rungta played first-class cricket for Maharashtra and Rajasthan from 1953 to 1970. He served as the Indian national cricket selector from March 1998 to September 1998. His elder brother Purushotham went onto serve as BCCI treasurer in 1970s.

Death 
Kishan died due to COVID-19 at the age of 88. He was hospitalized in Jaipur after being tested positive for COVID-19.

References 

1932 births
2021 deaths
People from Rajasthan
India national cricket team selectors
Indian cricketers
Maharashtra cricketers
Rajasthan cricketers
Central Zone cricketers
Rajasthan cricket captains
Deaths from the COVID-19 pandemic in India
People from Jhunjhunu district